Duelo is a Mexican norteño band from  Roma, Texas. The band is also known as Grupo Duelo and originally known as Duelo Norteño. The group rose to prominence in the early 2000s and continues to record to the present day.

Discography

Studio albums

As Duelo Norteño 

 Si acaso me escuchas (1998) (Debut album)
 Duelo Norteño (1999) (This album and its successor contain songs from "Si acaso me escuchas" plus unreleased tracks)
 Duelo Norteño II (1999)

As Duelo
 El amor no acaba (2002) (First album on Fonovisa Records)
 Desde Hoy (2003)
 Para Sobrevivir (2004)
 En el área de sueños (2005)
 Relaciones Conflictivas (2006)
 En las manos de un ángel (2007)
 Historia de Valientes (2008)
 Necesito más de ti (2009) 
 Solamente Tú (2010)
 Por una mujer bonita: Corridos y Canciones (2010)
 Vuela Muy Alto (2011) (Last album on Fonovisa Records)
 Libre por naturaleza (2013) (First album on La Bonita Music)
 Navidad desde el meritito Norte (2014)
 Veneno (2015)
 Eres Vida (2020)
 No Digas no (2022)
 Nostalgia (Late 2022)

Compilation and live albums
 Mi Historia Musical (2004)
 En Vivo Desde Monterrey (2005) (Live album)
 Houston Rodeo Live! (2008) (Live album)
 Solo Hits (2008)
 On Tour (2009) (Live album)
 Vive Grupero 2010:El Concierto (2010) (Live album)
 20 Kilates (2014)

External links
 Official website

References

 01
American norteño musicians
Norteño music groups
Tejano music groups
American Latin musical groups
Musical groups from Texas
Fonovisa Records artists
Universal Music Latin Entertainment artists